The Municipality of Borovnica is a municipality in the Inner Carniola region of Slovenia. The seat of the municipality is the settlement of Borovnica. The municipality is southwest of the national capital Ljubljana.

Settlements
In addition to the municipal seat of Borovnica, the municipality also includes the following settlements:

 Breg pri Borovnici
 Brezovica pri Borovnici
 Dol pri Borovnici
 Dražica
 Lašče
 Laze pri Borovnici
 Niževec
 Ohonica
 Pako
 Pristava
 Zabočevo

References

External links

Municipality of Borovnica on Geopedia
Official page 
Unofficial page - Forum 

 
Borovnica
1994 establishments in Slovenia